The Oxford and Cambridge Cup is the trophy awarded to the winner of the Australian University Championship Men's Eight (formerly the Australian Universities Boat Race), and is competed for annually at the Australian University Games or the Australian University Rowing Championships (in either case, commonly known as the Inter-Varsity). It is the oldest inter-University competition in Australia. The cup is awarded to the winning men's Eight over a standard 2,000m course (1.24 miles).

The trophy was donated in 1893 by Old Blues of the Universities of Oxford and Cambridge. The original boat race was conducted over a 'Thames Putney Mortlake' equivalent course, which varied between 2 miles and  miles depending on location and conditions.

History 

The first Australian Universities Boat Race was raced in 1888 on the Yarra River, between the Universities of Adelaide, Melbourne and Sydney. The trophy was organised by Dr Edmond Warre, Headmaster of Eton College and former President of the Oxford University Boat Club. He suggested to the Old Blues of Oxford and Cambridge that a trophy be donated for Inter-University Eight competition in order to foster a continuing interest in the young competition. In an 1890 letter to Frederick Halcomb (Captain of the Adelaide University Boat Club) he states that "the idea was accepted by them with alacrity" and that they were "proud of the opportunity afforded them of showing their brotherhood, goodwill and interest in the welfare of their kinsmen in the antipodes”. The cup was sent out to Australia in time for the 1893 competition, where it was competed for and won by Melbourne.

The cup features scenes in bas-relief of Cambridge, Oxford, rowers and the floral emblems of the countries of England, Scotland and Wales. The Angel on the top is pictured in the traditional pose of the Toast to Rowing.  This long standing and traditional toast is afforded the winners of the Grand Challenge Cup.

Inter-Varsity competition 

The Australian Universities Boat Race began in 1870 when four oared crews representing Sydney and Melbourne Universities competed over a three-and-a-half-mile course on the Yarra River (Melbourne). Members of the crews also took part in the first cricket match between the two universities. The first race was won by Melbourne in 31 minutes and 4 seconds. The 2-man of the losing Sydney crew was Edmund Barton, who went on to become the first Prime Minister of Australia.

The first eight oared race between Australian Universities was conducted in 1888. Melbourne, Sydney and Adelaide Universities met on the Hombourg reach course of the Yarra River. Melbourne was recorded as having won by 5 lengths over Adelaide and a similar distance to third place Sydney. Adelaide achieved its first win in 1889 at their home course on the Port River, and again in 1896 when stroked by famed South Australian oarsman W.H. Gosse. Sydney's first win was in 1890.

In 1920, Queensland University entered a crew for the first time. The crew came third. Queensland steadily improved and, under the leadership of stroke E.B. Freeman, went on to win the 1922 and 1923 boat races.

The University of Tasmania boated its first inter-varsity crew in 1924. The Taswegians took the trophy home the following year in 1925. This crew, stroked by R.A. Scott, defeated the highly fancied Sydney crew on the Brisbane River.

The West Australians followed their interstate brethren and boated their first crew in 1927. This crew, stroked by F.A. Williams, took the cup home in their debut race.

With the development of tertiary education in Australia in the 1950s and 1960s it was not long before numerous additional universities sought entry into the boat race. In 1956 New South Wales, 1963 Monash, 1966 Australian National and Newcastle, 1969 La Trobe and 1973 Macquarie Universities gained entry. The Australian higher education reforms of the early 1990s opened the door for many former Technical Colleges and Colleges of Advanced Education to enter the boat race for the first time.

1968 was the last year that the race was held over the traditional 'Thames Putney Mortlake' equivalent course. Due to increasing pressure for a standardised course distance, fairer courses, and the increasing focus of state and national programs on the Olympic distance, delegates from the competing University Boat Clubs of 1968 voted that all future races be conducted over a 2,000m course from 1969 onward.

Results by Year

Running total
The Oxford and Cambridge Cup has been won by eight universities since the inception of the competition. Melbourne and Sydney Universities have dominated, between them winning about two-thirds of the time. It has been won at least once by every state, but neither of the territories. All of Australia's "sandstone universities" have won the cup, and of the Group of Eight universities, the University of New South Wales is the only one not yet to have achieved a win.

The 123rd race was conducted in 2022.

References

Australian Rowing History – University Championships (Index) 
John Lang, The Victorian Oarsman, 1919

External links
Australian Rowing History – University Championships 

Rowing in Australia
History of rowing
Oxbridge
Awards established in 1893
Rowing competitions in Australia
1893 establishments in the United Kingdom
Rwoing
Rowing trophies and awards